Vangelis Moras (born 26 August 1981) is a Greek former professional footballer who played as a centre back and currently a manager.

Club career

Early years
Moras started his football Ampelokipoi Larissa and in 1999 he moved to AEL. In 2001 he played for Proodeftiki and after one season at the club, they won promotion to the first division in 2002.

AEK Athens
After having impressed in his first season in the first division, Moras was transferred to AEK Athens for €260,000, as a personal choice of the then coach, Dušan Bajević. He stayed at the club even at the new effort made by the Demis Nikolaidis administration in 2004 and left in 2007. With AEK he also competed in European in the UEFA Champions League group stage in 2003 and 2006, while also played in the Cup final on 10 May 2006 losing to Olympiacos. He left the club on in 2007 after his contract was expired.

Bologna
On 1 July 2007, Moras signed for the Italian club Bologna. After his first season there, he helped the club to win promotion to the Serie A. Moras scored his first goal for Bologna against S.S.C. Napoli scoring the winning goal.

He made 104 appearances in his career at Bologna in all competitions.

Swansea City
On 14 October 2011, it was confirmed that the player had joined Premier League team Swansea City. Brendan Rodgers’ defensive headache has eased slightly with FIFA finally giving Swansea City the green light to sign Vangelis Moras on a three-month deal. The Greek defender, a free agent having left Bologna in the summer, agreed terms with Swansea after a successful trial in South Wales, scoring a goal in a friendly against Llanelli on 7 October 2011, but delays in processing the paperwork looked set to leave Rodgers with only one fully fit centre-half for Saturday's trip to Norwich. He made his Premier League debut in a 2–2 draw with Wolves on 22 October 2011. He left the club after his three-month deal expired in January 2012.

Cesena
Cesena officially signed Moras a free agent after his short-term contract with Swansea expired and has signed a new deal until the end of the season. The Sea Horses announced that Moras will undergo his medical on Thursday before taking on his first training session.

In his interview, the defender who was under contract until June, was ready to take the field against Novara: "I am happy for my arrival even with a two-years' delay, as last season we were very close. With Swansea I did not go well (only 7 games with 6 of them with the reserve-team), so I desperately want to go back to Italy and I thanks Cesena for this opportunity."
Furthermore, he said that "the situation is difficult but we can save, I'm used to fighting. I know the coach, it was he who took me to Italy, in Bologna, where I stayed four seasons, the best time of my career so far. I am a close friend of Antonioli together we were rossoblù: it was old then, it's old now, nothing has changed." 

On 21 January 2012, he made his debut with Cesena in a 5–1 loss with Roma. Besides the fact that he is regular starter until the end of the 2011/12 season, he left the club after his six-month deal expired in June 2012.

Hellas Verona
On 1 July 2012, Moras signed for the Italian club Hellas Verona. After his first season there, he helped the club to win promotion to the Serie A. In June 2013, Panathinaikos is chasing the signature of the Greek international, as the club looks to begin rebuilding after a disappointing season. The Athenian giants missed out on European football for the first time in almost two decades last season and the club is expected to change its approach to the transfer market drastically this summer.
A key part of that approach will be focusing on bringing in Greek players and staff, whilst avoiding the exorbitant wages it has previously paid for underperforming foreign players. Moras, who was a key part of Hellas Verona's promotion to Serie A last season, has reportedly been in contact with the club. Panathinaikos did not easily give up, offering him a two-year contract worth around €200-250,000 a year.

Eventually, the upcoming deal with Panathinaikos did not come to an end and the Greek defender signed with the club for another year. Moras scored his first goal for Verona against Varese scoring the winning goal.
In a game against Bologna, Moras did not react to a biff from Jonatan Cristaldo during the Serie A match between his club and Bologna FC at Stadio Marc'Antonio Bentegodi on March 2, 2014, in Verona, showing his character and moral. Additionally, on 9 April 2014, in an interview had made clear that Hellas Verona are not thinking about Europe, but only finishing out the season well. The club has been one of the surprise packages of the season and until recently were in direct competition for a spot in the Europa League. However, on from a recent fall in form, their Greek international centre-back has made clear where focus truly lies. "Europe? I don’t even want to hear that word," he told reporters at a trade event this week. "We are thinking about every Sunday's game, we will see at the end where we will be. I am not thinking about Europe, it is the only thing that can make me feel bad. Now we hope to close the season out very well, because it is good for the club and for the fans. This was a very difficult season, we were able to achieve safety in March and this was an important thing. It was not easy to reach this target and teams with more experienced players were not able to do it, and we have. Now let's enjoy this moment, we have been through some difficulties and we now think to finish well."

Vangelis Moras will be part of the 23 players of Greece that will fly in Brazil. A great season with Hellas Verona's performance level that has not gone unnoticed by Fernando Santos, coach of Greece, who decided to bet big on him. But the first to believe in the quality of Vangelis Moras of Bologna was Fabrizio Salvatori, who took him in red and blue, " ...was released, and really wanted to come to Italy – says Salvatori exclusive to GianlucaDiMarzio.com – He accepted a year contract with an option for three more years if he had done well, and so it was with Bologna in Serie B came by a couple of goals in that year, and contributing significantly to the promotion. He steadily grows in confidence, which led him to play in the World Cup. He is a versatile player who improves every year. But even before this is a great guy who deserves this call, after he has done very well this year in Verona." 

On 8 July 2014 Hellas Verona have renewed Greek international Moras’ contract until June 2015.  The defender put pen to paper on a new deal, which includes an option to add another year until June 2016. On 21 April 2015 Vangelis Moras reached 100 appearances with the jersey of Hellas Verona and Greek international defender celebrated, by holding a Greek flag on Instagram.

On 17 May 2015, Vangelis Moras in an interview, has expressed his concern regarding the future of the club in the midst of rumors suggesting that the club might be sold. Speaking after his side's 2–1 win over Empoli, the Greek centre-back also demanded more clarity from owner Maurizio Setti despite the Italian businessman having recently stated that the club will not be sold in the summer. "The president has denied the sale of the club, but I want more certainty," said the 33-year-old to Sky Sport Italia."And I hope all things are sorted and we’ll be ready to start again properly from next season." This situation is being much talked about because there are a number of Gialloblu players whose contract expire in the summer of 2015, including that of Moras.

On 18 September 2015, Moras stated that he wants to finish his career with Hellas Verona " Ours is not a job like any other, in a football team we are mates, the fans and the company. I am at Verona for four years and for me it's like a second family. All helped me to deal with this difficult problem, all were close to me and I can only say thank you to the men with whom I have a relationship important and special. I feel part of this team and I want to close my career here. Toughest opponents? No doubt those lower down in the standings, one must not underestimate them because they might put you in more trouble than large. " said to calcionews. On 29 November 2015, he scored his first goal for the 2015–16 season in a 2–3 away loss against Frosinone with his header from a corner somehow squirming through Nicola Leali's hands in a goalkeeping howler.

Bari
On 5 July 2016 F.C. Bari 1908 announced Moras had signed a two-year deal with the club. He played as a starter in the first Serie B games, but on 5 September 2016, after the training he went for medical examinations that revealed a muscle injury. On 22 October 2016, he returned to the starting XI of the squad in a home game against Trapani Calcio.

Panetolikos
On 30 August 2017, Moras signed a contract with Panetolikos, returning to Greece after almost 10 years in Italy.
On 9 December 2017 Vangelis Moras reached 100 appearances in the Superleague Greece.

Return to AEL
On 31 January 2018, AEL officially announced the acquisition of experienced former international central midfielder on a six-months contract. The 37-year-old player, returned in his hometown Larissa, after 16 years and will probably close there his football career. Moras begun the 2017–18 season in Panetolikos but was released after six months due to mutual disagreement. On 30 March 2019, he scored his first goal with the club with a powerful header from Stefan Živković’s corner sealing a 2–1 home win game against rivals Asteras Tripolis in his club effort to avoid relegation.

Apollon Larissa
On 9 September 2020, Moras signed with Super League Greece 2 club Apollon Larissa a year contract for an undisclosed fee. On 17 March 2021 he scored his first goal with the new team against O.F. Ierapetra with the match ended 1-1.

On 7 July 2021, he announced via Instagram his retirement from professional football.

International career
Moras competed for Greece at the 2004 Summer Olympics.

Following some impressive performances for his club in the Serie A, Moras was called up to play for Greece on 11 February 2009 in a friendly against Denmark, where he made his international debut. Greece manager Otto Rehhagel announced the ten men who will make up part of the squad to will take on the Danes in Piraeus, with the remainder of locally based players to be called up as the match approaches. It is Moras’ name that stands out, the former AEK Athens man clearly having impressed Rehhagel in the Serie A this season.

The 27-year-old has established himself in manager Siniša Mihajlović's first-team, making 18 appearances and even having managed to score a goal during his side's 2–1 away loss against Inter Milan. Quoted by the Hellenic Football Federation (EPO) official website, the Bologna centre-back expressed a desire to seize the rare opportunity; if he plays against Denmark it will be his first ever appearance for the national team. "My call-up to the national team is something that I wanted after all the efforts of my career, something that they have vindicated. I am grateful to the people who have shown faith in me. On my part, I am prepared to do everything to please my manager and to maintain my position in the national team for a long time."  Moras said.

Moras exceptional season year with Hellas Verona was his passport not only to be called by Santos to the 30 man provisional World Cup squad, but also to the final 23-man squad for 2014 FIFA World Cup.

Managerial career
On 12 July 2021, Gamma Ethniki (third tier) Greek club P.O. Elassona announced the signing of Moras as their manager for the 2021–22 Gamma Ethniki season. He successfully managed the team to their second Larissa FCA Cup win, after beating Iraklis Larissa in the final.

On 5 July 2022, it was announced that Moras returned to Apollon Larissa as manager. He resigned on 10 December 2022, citing disorganization within the club structure.

On 4 February 2023, Moras joined Ethnikos Neo Keramidi in the Gamma Ethniki.

Managerial statistics 
As of 19 March 2023.

Honours

Player 
AEK Athens

 Greek Cup runner-up: 2005–06

Manager

P.O. Elassona
 Larissa FCA Cup: 2021–22

Personal life
In July 2014, Moras travelled to Australia to donate bone marrow to his brother Dimitris, who had been diagnosed with acute myeloid leukaemia while on holiday in the country and was being treated in a Melbourne hospital.  On 17 July 2015, Moras' brother left his last breath in Larissa State Hospital, where he had been transferred recently.
On 27 August 2015, Moras received in the Red Room of the Province of Verona the Award "Grande della Scala" by Presidente Giunta Provincia Antonio Pastorello, after the battle alongside his brother, who died from acute myeloid leukaemia last July.

On 20 February 2016, at the stadium Bentegodi, on the occasion of the derby between Hellas Verona F.C. and Chievo will host the "Save Moras" initiative, promoted by the Foundation to sensitize citizens on the importance of bone marrow donation and support for people affected by leukemia. "Save Moras" was founded by Vangelis Moras in memory of his brother Dimitris, who died in 2015 due to leukemia.  During the match, both teams perform on their uniforms playing a patch with the logo of the "Save Moras";  all mesh used by the players during the competition will then be auctioned and the proceeds will be donated to the Foundation.  In the interval between the 1st and the 2nd time, the boys of the project "CSI- The Great Challenge" will play in a mini derby wearing the jerseys of professional football players.

References

External links
 
 
 

1981 births
Living people
Footballers from Larissa
Greek footballers
Greek football managers
Greece international footballers
Greece under-21 international footballers
Olympic footballers of Greece
Footballers at the 2004 Summer Olympics
Athlitiki Enosi Larissa F.C. players
AEK Athens F.C. players
Swansea City A.F.C. players
Bologna F.C. 1909 players
A.C. Cesena players
Hellas Verona F.C. players
S.S.C. Bari players
Panetolikos F.C. players
Proodeftiki F.C. players
Greek expatriate footballers
Greek expatriate sportspeople in Italy
Expatriate footballers in Italy
Expatriate footballers in Wales
Super League Greece players
Football League (Greece) players
Serie A players
Serie B players
Premier League players
2010 FIFA World Cup players
2014 FIFA World Cup players
Association football defenders